The RAC Foundation (The Royal Automobile Club Foundation for Motoring) is a registered charity. 
 
It is a transport policy and research organisation that explores the economic, mobility, safety and environmental issues relating to roads and their users. It publishes independent and authoritative research with which it promotes informed debate and advocates policy in the interests of the responsible motorist.

It was established as the research arm of RAC Motoring Services Ltd in 1991, when Motoring Services was owned by the Royal Automobile Club. In 1999, when Motoring Services was sold by the club, the foundation became an independent organisation. It later gained charitable status.

History
The foundation was formed in 1991.

It became independent of RAC Motoring Services in 1999 and received a legacy from the members of the Royal Automobile who had sold RAC Motoring Services. It subsequently became a charity.

The current director is Steve Gooding CB who took up the post in May 2015 
, taking over from Stephen Glaister who was in the role from April 2008 before leaving to take up a non-executive directorship at the Office of Rail and Road, where he subsequently became chair.

Gooding had previously been director general of roads, traffic and local group at the Department for Transport and led the work that resulted in the transformation of the Highways Agency into Highways England. He started with the Civil Service in 1983 and moved into the central transport department in 1988 where he worked until joining the foundation except for periods spent in the Cabinet Office, the Government Office for London and the Office of the Rail Regulator.

The foundation's first director was Edmund King. He later left to become president of the Automobile Association.

The first chair of the foundation was Sir Christopher Foster (Cantab), an academic at the University of Oxford and MIT, a professor of economics at the London School of Economics, a consultant at Coopers & Lybrand, and then PricewaterhouseCoopers, and a temporary civil servant. He was a special adviser to Barbara Castle, Dick Marsh, Tony Crosland and Peter Shore.

Foster was followed in 2003 by David Holmes CB who was formerly director of government and industry affairs at British Airways and prior to that held several senior positions in the Department for Transport, including deputy secretary with responsibility for roads and traffic.

Holmes was succeeded in July 2009 by David Quarmby, a consultant in transport, planning, economics and tourism. He was previously a non-executive director of NedRailways (UK) and a former director of Colin Buchanan and Partners. For 12 years he was a main board member of Sainsbury's, first as logistics director and latterly as joint managing director.

In July 2013, Quarmby was replaced as chair by Joe Greenwell CBE, the former chair of Ford UK. Greenwell had previously been: Vice President, Government Affairs, Premier Automotive Group and Ford of Europe; Chairman and CEO of Jaguar and Land Rover; and Vice President, Marketing and Operations, Ford Motor Company.

The current chair Is Neville Jackson who took up the position in April 2020. Between 2010 and 2019 Jackson was the chief technology and innovation officer at the engineering and environmental consultancy firm Ricardo PLC. A visiting professor at the University of Brighton, Jackson is also a non-executive director of the UK Advanced Propulsion Centre. Trained as a mechanical engineer at Imperial College, London, he is a previous chair of the UK Low Carbon Vehicles Partnership.

Organisation
The foundation has a board of six trustees including Neville Jackson who sits as its chair.

The Public Policy Committee, also chaired by Neville Jackson, is an advisory body consisting of approximately a dozen members with relevant transport experience and interests, mainly drawn from academia, politics and business. The committee is consulted about research, strategy, major campaigns and future policy.

Day-to-day activity is managed by the director and various permanent staff.

Work
The foundation's research falls into four main categories: economics, environment, mobility and safety. All of the research is available on the RAC Foundation website including interactive and automatically updated data charts relating to such things as fuel prices and the take up of ultra-low emission vehicles.

Some research is carried out in-house. The foundation also commissions experts in their field to investigate key areas of transport policy.

In 2010 and 2011 the foundation was one of the sponsors of the RAC Brighton to London Future Car Challenge. The foundation analysed the data collected from the low carbon cars that completed the run and published its conclusions in Shades of Green (2010) and The Green Charge (2011).

In 2017 the foundation contributed to Gergely Raccuja's winning entry in the Wolfson Economics Prize. The work - Miles Better - explored how a distance-based charge collected by insurers might eventually replace fuel duty and VED as revenue falls with the greening of the vehicle fleet.

In June 2018 it was announced that The RAC Foundation was to receive £480,000 of funding from the Department for Transport to support its Road Collision Investigation Project with the aim of trialling "an innovative new approach to road casualty investigation, looking more closely at what is really causing road collisions."

Reports
Key publications and research include:
Roads and Reality
The Car in British Society
Governing and Paying for England’s Roads
Keeping the Nation Moving
Fuel for Thought, the What, Why and How of Motoring Taxation
On the Move: Car and Rail Travel Trends
Powering Ahead: Future of Low-Carbon Cars and Fuels
Ploughing On - Winter Resilience Review
The Car and the Commute
Graduated Driver Licensing - Mapping the Cost of Young Driver Accidents
Saving Lives by Lowering Legal Drink-Drive Limit
Effectiveness of Average Speed Cameras
Air Quality and Road Transport
Diesel Scrappage - Could it Work?
Towards an Accident Investigation Branch for Roads
New car mileage - analysis of MOT data

References

External links
 RAC Foundation website

Automobile associations in the United Kingdom
Road safety
Transport advocacy groups of the United Kingdom
Transport charities based in the United Kingdom
Road safety in the United Kingdom
1991 establishments in the United Kingdom
Organizations established in 1991
Motoring Advocacy groups